The Hooghly Industrial Belt or Kolkata Industrial Belt is India's oldest and second largest Industrial area (Silpancalasilpancalati) the banks of the Hooghly river in the north to the south of Triveni-Kalyani, Uluberia-Biralapura 100 km long and 15–10 km wide zone to the industrial development of the Kolkata district and some part of North 24 Parganas, South 24 Parganas, Nadia, Hooghly district and Howrah district. 

The industrial belt has 8,746 registered large factories (1989) besides 33,749 registered small factories (1990). Of the total 20 lakh industrial workers 12.7 lakh are engaged in transport and tertiary services, 2.4 lakh in jute industry, and 2.2 lakh in engineering and cotton textile industries. On the basis of the value of industrial output, transport and tertiary industry comes on the top (Rs. 1,327 million), followed by jute manufacturing (Rs. 1,323 million), manufacturing (Rs. 950 million), chemicals (Rs. 542 million), iron and steel (Rs. 444 million), non-jute textiles (Rs. 255 million), and food products (Rs. 168 million) (Bose, 1965).

Main industries

Jute industry
The main industry is the jute industry of Hoogly industrial area. The first jute mill of the country was established in this region. Currently, there are 60 jute mills in this industrial area. 74 percent of the total jute mills in India are mainly. The jute mills are mainly developed  in Baj Baj, Birkhalur, Uluberia, Sankrail, Titagarh, Jagaddal, Kankinara, Bhadreswar, Agarpara and Bali areas have been developed. Most jute mills are in Titagarh, Uluberia, Bali and Bawajj areas. Jute of low Ganges valley, Coal of Raniganj, Hooghly river water, CESC and WBSEB power and local cheap workers. Industry has been helpful.

Textile or artificial weaving industry

There are about 40 pieces of textile in the Hughli industrial area. This call is available in Gulhahora, Sodapur, Kakinara, belaghariya, Shayamnagar and Panihati uthecheei up in huge demand in the region, South India and West India amadanakrta cotton, has helped to develop local capital funds in this textile mill.

Heavy engineering industry

Heavy engineering  is one of the most important industries in the Hoogly industrial area. The heavy engineering industries of this industrial area- 
 Construction of motor vehicles – Hindustan Motors Limited (Hindmotor) (Closed), Zaneti (Chinsura) 
 Shipbuilding Factory- Garden Reach Shipbuilders & Engineers (Garden Reach)
 Cranes, wagons, rail coaches, weaving industries Construction of the building is done by JSP and Company Limited (Dumdum), Textile Machinery Corp Ltd (Behala), Braithwaite and Company Limited (Howrah), Burn Standard Company Limited (Howrah) 
 Electric Fan and Sewing Cloth – Usha Company (Tollygunge) 
 Railway Engine Repair Factory – Lilua and Kanchrapara

Paper industry

The paper industry is used as the raw material of the industrial area of Bamboo and sabaighas' in Jharkhand and  Chhattisgarh.This paper is mainly made of writing paper and tissue paper in the factories. The factories are – 
 Imami Paper Mills (Dakshineswar) 
 Tribeni Tissues Limited (Tribeni) – Under ITC.

Chemical industry

Kolkata and adjoining areas, chemical  industries have been established. They mainly produce coastal soda, sulfuric acid and soda as well. They also make color polythene, plastic medicines. Principal factory- 
 Bengal Chemical (Panihati),
 Dez Medical (Calcutta).
 Alkalie and Chemical Corporation of India Limited (RISHA), under ICI.

Leather industry

The leather industry has been set up in the Banatola's Kolkata Leather Complex and Botanagar in Badajnagar. The Tannery and Tiljala have been shifted to Bantalaya. The booth company of Batangarh is famous for its shoes. Currently there is a shoe factory in Bantalay.

IT industry

IT industry has a total of 100 IT companies in the industry. The eligible companies are – RS Software, CCS, Globusin Technology etc. The Software Technology Park in Salt Lake has been developed.

Other industry

Other industries are:

 Cement Construction – Dankuni 
 Wrestling Construction Industry – Kashipur, Dumdum and Ichapur 
 Yarn Factory – Kalyani 
 Aluminum Factory – Belur 
 Rubber Factories – Dunlop, 
 Lilium and Calcium  Carbide Factories – Beerlapur 
 Jewellery Industry – Masonry, Salt Lake.

References

Neighbourhoods in Howrah
Economy of West Bengal
Jute industry of India
Tea industry in India
Manufacturing in India